Larache is a city in northwestern Morocco. It is on the Moroccan coast, where the Loukkos River meets the Atlantic Ocean. Larache is one of the most important cities of the Tanger-Tetouan-Al Hoceima region.

Many civilisations and cultures have influenced the history of Larache, starting in the ancient city of Lixus during the 12th centuryBCE. Between the period of being a strategic Berber town and then a Phoenician trading centre to Morocco's independence era around the 1950s, Larache was a nexus for many cultures.

History

The city is not mentioned in Arabic historical sources until the 13th century, but it was reportedly founded by the Banu 'Arus tribe. Because of the abundant vines in the area, they named it al-'Ara'ish, meaning "trellis of grape vines", or al-'Arīsh mtā' Bnī 'Arūs ("grape vine trellis of the Banu 'Arus") in longer form. The Almohad caliph Ya'qub al-Mansur (r. 1184–1199) built a fortress here in the late 12th century. In 1270, the Spanish led a successful raid on the city.

In 1471, the Portuguese settlers from Asilah and Tangier drove the inhabitants out of Larache, and again it remained uninhabited until the Saadi Sultan Mohammed ash-Sheikh decided to repopulate it and build a stronghold on the plateau above river Loukos. He constructed a fortress at the entrance to the port as a means of controlling access to the river.

For a long time, attempts by the Portuguese, Spanish and French to take it met with no success. The Portuguese established the nearby Graciosa fortress in 1489. The Kasbah, which was built in 1491 by Moulay en Nasser, later became a pirate stronghold. 

In 1610, the town passed to the Spanish, who stayed there until 1689, but who mainly used the ports as trading stops and never really administered the town. Moulay Ismail finally conquered Larache in 1689.

Attacks on Larache continued, but it still remained in Muslim hands. In 1765, a French fleet failed in the Larache expedition. In 1829, the Austrians punitively bombarded the city due to Moroccan piracy. Due to the colonisation era Spain took Larache in 1911 and held it for 45 years until 1956.

On 7 March 2023, Moroccan archaeologists discovered an ancient tomb dating back over 2,000 years to the Mauretanian period.

Geography 
The city is located on the northwestern coast of Morocco, on the south bank at the mouth of the Loukkos River. The city consists of a compact medina (historic old town), situated next to the river, and a larger "new town", established outside the old medina by the Spanish colonial administration after 1911 and stretching southwards over the coastal plateau.

Climate 
Larache has a hot-summer Mediterranean climate (Köppen climate classification Csa) with heavy rainfall. The summers are moderately hot and sunny - ideal for the city's beaches - and the winters are wet and cool.

Demographics 
In the 2014 Moroccan census Larache recorded a population of 125,008 inhabitants.

Economy 
Larache's economy is focused on agriculture, fishing, and manufacturing. Its port exports produce, timber, and wool.

Sites of interest

Landmarks 
Port Lixus
Plaza de España
Oued Loukos (Loukkos River)
Charie Mohammed Al-Khamis (Boulevard Mohammed V)
Storks Castle
Boukharis House
Torres Park
Jardin of Lions
The Conservatory of Music
Kessba, Gebibat & Bab Behar (Old Medina)
Port of Larache
Dghoghi Houses
Balcon Atlantico 
Grave of Jean Genet

Lixus 

Lixus is the site of an ancient city located in Morocco just north of the modern seaport of Larache on the bank of the Loukkos River. It was built by a Berber king in 1180 BC. Lixus was one of the Kingdom of Mauretania's ancient cities.

It was settled by the Phoenicians in the 7th century BC. Lixus was part of a chain of Phoenician/Carthaginian settlements; other major settlements further to the south are Chellah and Mogador. When Carthage fell to Ancient Rome, Lixus, Chellah and Mogador were annexed to the Kingdom of Mauretania.

This ancient Mauritanian city gradually grew in importance, later coming under Carthaginian domination. After the destruction of Carthage, Lixus fell to Amazigh (Berber) control, reaching its zenith during the reign of the Mauritanian king Juba II.

Some ancient Greek writers located at Lixus the mythological garden of the Hesperides, the keepers of the golden apples. The name of the city which was often mentioned by writers from Hanno the Navigator to the Geographer of Ravenna and confirmed by the legend on its coins and by an inscription. The ancients believed this to be the site of the Garden of the Hesperides and of a sanctuary of Hercules, where Hercules gathered gold apples, more ancient than the one at Cadiz, Spain. However, there are no grounds for the claim that Lixus was founded at the end of the second millennium BC. Life was maintained there nevertheless until the Islamic conquest of North Africa by the presence of a mosque and a house with a patio with walls covered with painted stuccos.

Education
The Colegio Español Luis Vives, a Spanish international school, is in Larache.

Famous people 

Sidi Jilali bin Abd Allah El-Masbahi, native of Saqiyat al-Hamar, is considered a saint of Larache.
Lalla Mennana El-Mesbahi (El-Masbahiya), his daughter, is also considered a saint and patroness of the city.
Tayeb bin Mohamed bin Laarbi El-Mesbahi, The great-grandson of Lalla Mennana, who was in charge of her mausoleum and one of the most revered persons in the city. 
 Jean Genet lived for several years and had requested to be buried there. His grave is in the Spanish cemetery of Larache.
 Amina Filali, whose suicide in 2012 sparked a political debate on women's rights and article 475 of the Moroccan penal code.
 Juan Goytisolo, Spanish novelist, is buried in the Spanish cemetery of Larache.

Gallery

Sister cities
 Almuñécar, Spain

See also
 Larache Province
 Lixus
 Loukkos River
 Chabab Larache an old famous football club from the city
 Oussama Belhcen a musician from Larache
 European enclaves in North Africa before 1830

References and notes

External links

Website of the latest news about the city and its region 24/24h
Official Website in Spanish
Forum of Larache City in Arabic
Entry in Lexicorient
Encyclopedia Islam (p. 418)

Populated places in Larache Province
Populated coastal places in Morocco
Port cities and towns on the Moroccan Atlantic Coast
Former Spanish colonies
Provincial capitals in Morocco